The  is the largest ski resort in Tōhoku region, Japan, operated by .

The resort is mostly famous for its ski slopes in winter, but trekking is also popular sports in summer season.

Ski resort
Especially, top of mountain is famous for soft rime. Even if you are not skier or snowboarder, you can go there by Zaō Ropeway.

Courses
All slopes allow skiing, snowboarding, and snowscooting.
Slopes for beginners: 28
Slopes for intermediate skiers: 19
Slopes for advanced skiers: 10
Total: 57

Treck
Most of trecking course around Mount Zao is start from this resort. Especially, the course going to the 'Five Color Pond' (五色沼, goshiki numa) is popular.
This area has abundant alpine plants like Dactylorhiza aristata, Dicentra peregrina and so on.

Zaō Jump Stadium in Yamagata 

 is FIS certified ski jumping stadium. It is located in a location that is sandwiched Kami-no-dai slopes and Ryūzan slopes. K = 90m, HS = 100m.

It was built to fit the Inter skiing Zaō tournament of 1979. Tournament of FIS certified than 1989 to 2011 (International Zao jump competitions NHK Trophy and international Zao jump tournament Yamagata Mayor's Cup) has been held. In March 2012 FIS Ski Jumping World Cup Ladies is held for the first time in Japan, has been organized each year two races later.

Others
There is Zaō Onsen in the foot of this resort, and there are about 120 accommodations.

See also
List of ski areas and resorts in Japan

External links
 Yamagata Zao Onsen Ski Resort official website
 Ski Area Map

Ski areas and resorts in Japan
Sports venues in Yamagata Prefecture
Yamagata, Yamagata
Sports venues completed in 1979
1979 establishments in Japan